Alex Valdez is an American politician who is the member of the Colorado House of Representatives from the 5th district in the City and County of Denver.

Background
Valdez grew up in Aurora, Colorado and attended Rangeview High School. After graduating Rangeview in 1999, Valdez attended Embry-Riddle Aeronautical University in Daytona Beach, Florida. Valdez then transferred to the University of Colorado Boulder and graduated with a History degree in 2004.

Prior to serving in the Colorado Legislature, Valdez founded his own company, EcoMark Solar. Valdez started EcoMark when the 2008 recession hit and grew EcoMark into one of Colorado's largest solar companies. Ecomark Solar unfortunately went out of business in Oct 2022 after struggling to adjust to the changes of the solar industry during the Covid-19 pandemic.  Ecomark's closure also lead to a large amount of complaints from customers who paid for systems that were never installed and employees who were never paid for outstanding commissions owed.

Political career
Valdez was elected in the general election on November 6, 2018, winning 79 percent of the vote over 19 percent of Republican candidate Katherine Whitney.

Valdez was the first ever first-year legislator appointed to a leadership in the Colorado House of Representatives and soon after was named the Chair of the Energy and Environment Committee, Chair of the LGBTQ Caucus, and Chair of the Latino Caucus. Valdez also services on the State, Civic, Military, and Veterans Affairs Committee and recently founded the General Aviation Caucus.

Valdez is well known for his environmental work, including the Plastic Pollution Reduction Act, Air Toxics, Air Quality Improvements, and Building Energy Codes. Valdez's environmental priorities include accelerating vehicle electrification, increasing renewable energy, and reducing air pollution. As a member of the LGBTQ+ community, Valdez has championed LGBTQ+ legislation including HIV Prep and cultural competency healthcare bills. Valdez is also recognized for his animal advocacy, specifically Punky's Law.

He is openly gay.

Valdez had an extremely short run for Mayor of Denver which lasted from November of 2022 to Jan of 2023.

References

Valdez, Alex
Living people
Hispanic and Latino American state legislators in Colorado
21st-century American politicians
LGBT state legislators in Colorado
Gay politicians
1981 births
21st-century American LGBT people